The posterior ligament of the lateral malleolus (posterior tibiofibular ligament, posterior inferior ligament) is smaller than the anterior ligament of the lateral malleolus and is disposed in a similar manner on the posterior surface of the syndesmosis. It connects the tibia and fibular on the inferior part of both bones.

References

External links
Overview at maitrise-orthop.com

Ligaments of the lower limb